General elections were held in Yugoslavia on 24 September 2000. They included the presidential election, which was held using the two-round system, with a second round scheduled for 8 October. After the first round, the Federal Electoral Commission announced that Vojislav Koštunica of the Democratic Opposition of Serbia (DOS) was just short of the majority of all votes cast needed to avoid a runoff against the runner-up and incumbent president Slobodan Milošević. However, the DOS coalition claimed that Koštunica had received 52.54% of the vote. This led to open conflict between the opposition and government. The opposition organized demonstrations in Belgrade on 5 October 2000, after which Milošević resigned on 7 October and conceded the presidency to Koštunica. USAID subsequently released revised election results with Koštunica having slightly over 50% of all votes cast.

In the Federal Assembly elections, DOS emerged as the largest faction in the Chamber of Citizens, whilst the Socialist People's Party of Montenegro won the most seats in the Chamber of Republics. The elections were boycotted by the ruling coalition of Montenegro, led by the Democratic Party of Socialists.

Background
In the summer immediately following the NATO bombing of Yugoslavia, opposition parties began discussing who could run as a united opposition candidate in the upcoming elections. In a meeting in Budva that summer, Branislav Kovačević and Nenad Čanak proposed that Ivan Stambolić run for president with the backing of a multi-party coalition. After the formal establishment of the DOS coalition, Stambolić met with Kovačević on several occasions.

Several events occurred during the spring before the election that significantly contributed to a politically volatile environment; on 13 May 2000, the Chairman of the Executive Council of Vojvodina, Boško Perošević, was assassinated. Following his assassination, the Yugoslav Left announced it would propose a Law on the Defense of the State, which was scheduled to be assessed by the Parliament on 23 May 2000. Meanwhile, state-affiliated news outlets accused the opposition of the terrorism and subservience to NATO. The law was never passed through the Parliament.

In June 2000, Stambolić told Kovačević that he would run as the DOS candidate as long as the coalition parties approved of his candidacy, and that he run face-to-face against Milošević as opposed to a different SPS candidate.

On 6 July 2000, the parliament amended the constitution of Yugoslavia such that the president would no longer be selected by the Parliament, but would be directly elected instead. He also announced that the presidential and local elections in September would be held simultaneously; the constitution gave the president of Yugoslavia a four-year term, but Milošević organized presidential elections a year before his mandate expired.

On 25 August 2000, Stambolić disappeared. Witnesses said that he had been kidnapped and "thrown into a white van" after walking from Košutnjak to a local restaurant. Meanwhile, the DOS coalition formally endorsed Koštunica's candidacy. Dragan Maršićanin claimed that "voters were looking for someone who was a supporter of democracy but also a proven patriot and a nationalist in the kindest sense", and expressed his opinion that Koštunica had the closest such profile.

The Yugoslavian economy was struggling at the time of the elections; only a year after the NATO bombing campaign, many of the international sanctions remained in place, and inflation was over 100%. In the winter before the elections, the European Union sent heating fuel to the cities of Niš and Pirot, which were governed by opposition parties. Political scientist Michael Parenti asserted that the EU was ultimately denying such shipments to the remainder of Yugoslavia, offering humanitarian aid only to towns which were not governed by the ruling parties.

Some Kosovo Albanians voted for Milošević in hopes that it would lead to the further disintegration of Yugoslavia. This along with voter fraud and strong Kosovo Serb support allowed Milošević to win an absolute majority in the southern province of Kosovo.

Presidential candidates

Campaign
The DOS coalition asked the Serbian Renewal Movement to pull Vojislav Mihailović out of the race and to endorse their candidate, but Mihailović and his party refused. However, he added that if he were not to make it into a second round, that he would support Koštunica over Milošević in a runoff.

Koštunica officially began his campaign in the Braničevo District on 30 August 2000. On 2 September, he officially submitted his candidacy to the Federal Electoral Commission. Over the course of his campaign, he emphasized that he would seek the removal of international sanctions on Yugoslavia, return the country to international institutions such as the United Nations, and solve conflicts between the constituent republics of Serbia and Montenegro. Although Milo Đukanović supported Stambolić's bid for the DOS candidacy, he refused to support Koštunica and boycotted the election entirely. Likewise, Vuk Drašković also refused to endorse him.

Furthermore, Koštunica occasionally differed from the rest of the DOS coalition, such as in his criticism of the International Criminal Tribunal for the former Yugoslavia. He stated that "there are many things about the Hague tribunal that are more about politics than law", adding that Milošević's indictment would not necessarily be a priority if he were elected.

Involvement of the United States
In October 1999, the National Democratic Institute hosted a conference at the Marriott Hotel in Budapest, inviting activists from the Serbian opposition. In the conference, Douglas Schoen advised opposition activists to campaign in a united coalition. At the conference, activists were shown an opinion poll commissioned by Penn, Schoen & Berland Associates, depicting Koštunica with a greater probability of beating Milošević in an election than that of Zoran Đinđić. Koštunica's critical stance on the United States was also significant, as he and his party, Democratic Party of Serbia, categorically rejected US financial support. In spite of this, Koštunica was an inevitable beneficiary of US support, witting or not, as other parties associated with either the DOS coalition or the Otpor! movement received a sum of $41 million in financial support from the United States from 1999 to 2000. USAID provided 5,000 spray cans for anti-Milošević graffiti and the printing of 2.5 million stickers with the message "Gotov je", or "He's finished". The United States also paid for the training of electoral monitors in Szeged, Hungary, and subsequently paid monitors $5 each after the election.

On 15 August 2000, the United States Department of State announced the opening of an office of Yugoslav affairs within the US embassy in Budapest. The Department of State added that the office "will consist of State Department and [USAID] officials and will work to support the full range of democratic forces in Serbia". The office's budget and specific role was not disclosed by diplomats at the time. Koštunica, already under attack by accusations of collaborating with foreign powers, called the office "the kiss of death".

Results

President

After polling stations closed on 24 September, multiple parties and authorities reported extremely contradicting results. In a conference for journalists only a few hours after polling stations closed, Nikola Šainović initially announced that Milošević was leading with 50% to Koštunica's 31% of first round votes. On 25 September, the DOS coalition as well as the Serbian Radical Party and Serbian Renewal Movement announced that Koštunica won as much as 55% of the first round vote. The Federal Electoral Commission did not issue any statement until 26 September, when they announced that Koštunica had an eight-point lead in the first round, but did not record the required 50% of all votes cast to avoid a runoff vote. Electoral documents were subsequently incinerated. When Đinđić announced that his party, on the basis of votes counted in 98.5% of polling stations, that there was a discrepancy of 400,000 votes between his party's records and that of the Federal Electoral Commission, demonstrations ensued throughout multiple cities in Serbia.

Chamber of Citizens

Chamber of Republics

References

Elections in Serbia and Montenegro
Yugoslavia
2000 in Yugoslavia
Overthrow of Slobodan Milošević
Yugoslavia
Foreign electoral intervention
United States involvement in regime change